Mathematical puzzles make up an integral part of recreational mathematics. They have specific rules, but they do not usually involve competition between two or more players. Instead, to solve such a puzzle, the solver must find a solution that satisfies the given conditions. Mathematical puzzles require mathematics to solve them. Logic puzzles are a common type of mathematical puzzle.

Conway's Game of Life and fractals, as two examples, may also be considered mathematical puzzles even though the solver interacts with them only at the beginning by providing a set of initial conditions. After these conditions are set, the rules of the puzzle determine all subsequent changes and moves. Many of the puzzles are well known because they were discussed by Martin Gardner in his "Mathematical Games" column in Scientific American. Mathematical puzzles are sometimes used to motivate students in teaching elementary school math problem solving techniques. Creative thinkingor "thinking outside the box"often helps to find the solution.

List of mathematical puzzles 

This list is not complete.

Numbers, arithmetic, and algebra 
 Cross-figures or cross number puzzles
 Dyson numbers
 Four fours
 KenKen
 Water pouring puzzle
 The monkey and the coconuts
 Pirate loot problem
 Verbal arithmetics
 24 Game

Combinatorial 

 Cryptograms
 Fifteen Puzzle
 Kakuro
 Rubik's Cube and other sequential movement puzzles
Str8ts a number puzzle based on sequences
 Sudoku
 Sujiko
 Think-a-Dot
 Tower of Hanoi
 Bridges Game

Analytical or differential 

 Ant on a rubber rope

 See also: Zeno's paradoxes

Probability 

 Monty Hall problem

Tiling, packing, and dissection 

 Bedlam cube
 Conway puzzle
 Mutilated chessboard problem
 Packing problem
 Pentominoes tiling
 Slothouber–Graatsma puzzle
 Soma cube
 T puzzle
 Tangram

Involves a board 

 Conway's Game of Life 
 Mutilated chessboard problem
 Peg solitaire
 Sudoku 
 Nine dots problem

Chessboard tasks 

 Eight queens puzzle
 Knight's Tour
 No-three-in-line problem

Topology, knots, graph theory 

The fields of knot theory and topology, especially their non-intuitive conclusions, are often seen as a part of recreational mathematics.

 Disentanglement puzzles
 Seven Bridges of Königsberg
 Water, gas, and electricity
 Slitherlink

Mechanical 

 Rubik's Cube
 Think-a-Dot
 Matchstick puzzle

0-player puzzles 

 Conway's Game of Life 
 Flexagon  
 Polyominoes

References

External links
Historical Math Problems/Puzzles at Mathematical Association of America Convergence